The Yuki–Indigenous Council of the Ichilo River Native Community Lands (abbreviated TCO Yuqui-CIRI), originally the Yuki Indigenous Territory, is a collectively-owned indigenous territory in the province of Carrasco, Cochabamba, Bolivia, registered as a Native Community Land and titled by the National Agrarian Reform Institute in April 1997. Residents of the territory belong to the Yuki, Yuracaré, Trinitario, and Movima peoples. The titled territory consists of 115,924.9 hectares and had a population of 778 as of 2010.

There are six indigenous communities located within the territory: Bia Recuaté (Yuki), Tres
Islas, Puerto Las Flores, Tres Bocas (Yuracare), Capernaum (Movima), and Santa Isabel (Trinitario).

See also
 Indigenous peoples in Bolivia

References

Native Community Lands in Bolivia
Cochabamba Department